The 29th Blue Dragon Film Awards ceremony was held on November 20, 2008 at the KBS Hall in Yeouido, Seoul, South Korea. Hosted by actors Jung Joon-ho and Kim Hye-soo, it was presented by Sports Chosun and broadcast on KBS.

Nominations and winners
Complete list of nominees and winners:

(Winners denoted in bold)

References

2008 film awards
Blue Dragon Film Awards
2008 in South Korean cinema